Quinque is an unincorporated community in Greene County, Virginia, United States.

Geography 
It is located 2 miles north west of Ruckersville, on Route 33, the Spotswood Trail.

Name 
Quinque got its name from James Madison; it was his fifth (quinque is the number five in Latin) choice when looking to build his home in Virginia.

References
GNIS reference

Unincorporated communities in Greene County, Virginia
Unincorporated communities in Virginia